Eusebius Juma Mukhwana is the past president of the African agricultural NGOs Network based in Ghana. He is also a recipient of the Kenyan head of state commendation (HSC) for his role in assisting farmers to improve their food security and income. He has dedicated much of his life and work to the plight of small scale farmers. Mukhwana is also the founder of the SACRED Africa.

He went to Kibabii high school (1981–1986) and the University of Nairobi where he studied Veterinary Medicine. Mukhwana also holds a master's degree in Pharmacology and Toxicology from the University of Nairobi, Kenya; and a PhD in soil microbiology from the University of Wyoming in the USA. He has worked as a program officer with the Food and agricultural Research Management in Northern Kenya, has been the Director of the manor House agricultural Centre in Kitale, lectured at Moi University (1995–1997) and is the Founder Director of the Sustainable Agriculture Center for Research and Development in Africa (SACRED Africa). In 2009, Mukhwana was awarded the Norman Borlaug Award for Leadership in Agriculture. Nobel Laureate Norman E. Borlaug was the driving force behind the establishment of the World Food prize in 1985. The Norman Borlaug Award is given annually to recognise outstanding human achievements in the Fields of food production and nutrition. Mukhwana is one of the few individuals that won the award in 2009. In awarding Mukhwana, the committee stated he was being recognised for his contribution, dedication and promise in improving Kenyan's and Africa's food production in the 21st century.  Mukhwana currently works as the Director General and CEO of the Kenya National Qualifications Authority (KNQA); an organization that Regulates and Assures Quality at all levels of the Education sector in Kenya.  He previously worked as the Deputy Commission Secretary, Planning Research and Development at the Commission for University Education, Kenya.

Development record
In 1997, Mukhwana left Moi University and moved to rural Kenya. A year earlier, he had helped found SACRED Africa (more details at www.sacredafrica.org), whose main objective was to work with small scale farmers in Kenya to improve agricultural productivity, food security and income while conserving and enhancing the environment. Since its founding, SACRED Africa has become a reputable and formidable agricultural research and development organisation with research and training facilities in Bungoma, Kenya. Mukhwana is also the founding chairman of the Nzoia Water Services Co. Ltd, the company providing water and sanitation services to the towns on Bungoma, Kitale, Webuye and Kimilili in Western Kenya. Mukhwana currently serves as an associate editor with the American agronomy journal and is a distinguished scientist with grassroots practical experience.<ref>Mukhwana's many publications https://scholar.google.com/citations?user=phhew8oAAAAJ&hl=en>

Politics
In 2007 Mukhwana tried unsuccessfully to become the member of parliament for Kanduyi Constituency in Bungoma County, Kenya

References

1965 births
Living people
New Forum for the Restoration of Democracy–Kenya politicians
Academic staff of Moi University
Wiper Democratic Movement – Kenya politicians